Amaze Your Friends is a 1998 Ned Kelly Award-winning novel by Australian author Peter Doyle.

Awards
Ned Kelly Awards for Crime Writing, Best Novel, 1999: winner

Reviews
 "Australian Crime Fiction database"

References

Australian crime novels
1998 Australian novels
Ned Kelly Award-winning works